Pure and Applied Geophysics is a monthly peer-reviewed scientific journal that covers research in the field of geophysics. It is published by Birkhäuser and the editors-in-chief are  Carla F. Braitenberg (University of Trieste), Alexander B. Rabinovich (Russian Academy of Sciences), and Renata Dmowska (Harvard University). The journal was established in 1939 as Geofisica Pura e Applicata before obtaining its current title in 1964.

Abstracting and indexing
The journal is abstracted and indexed in:

According to the Journal Citation Reports, the journal has a 2021 impact factor of 2.641.

References

External links

English-language journals
Springer Science+Business Media academic journals
Geophysics journals
Monthly journals
Publications established in 1939